Warszawa Włochy railway station is a railway station in the Włochy district of Warsaw, Poland. It stands on the junction of lines 1 and 3: from here trains can either run on Line 1 towards Łódź or Line 3 towards Poznań. The station is served by Koleje Mazowieckie, who run trains from Skierniewice and Kutno to Warszawa Wschodnia, and Szybka Kolej Miejska, who run trains from Pruszków PKP to Otwock.

Until 1971, Warszawska Kolej Dojazdowa ran trains to Warszawa Włochy on a branch from Warszawa Szczęśliwice (itself replaced by Warszawa Aleje Jerozolimskie) when the branch was closed.

References

External links 
 
Station article at kolej.one.pl

Wlochy
Railway stations served by Koleje Mazowieckie
Railway stations served by Szybka Kolej Miejska (Warsaw)
Włochy